Cooking and eating utensils may refer to:

Cookware and bakeware, cooking containers
List of food preparation utensils, food preparation utensils
Cutlery, eating utensils
Chopsticks, used for both cooking and eating in Asian countries